The Eumenean Society is the oldest society at Davidson College; it was founded April 14, 1837. Formed as a literary society pursuing intellectual, moral, and social betterment, its mottoes are Pulchrum Est Colere Mentem (It is beautiful to cultivate the mind) and Kalon Aletheia Kai Monomon (Truth is beautiful and abiding). The society built its meeting place, Eumenean Hall, in 1849; the building has since been placed on the National Historic Register (1972), and named a Charlotte Mecklenburg Historic Site (1976).

References

Davidson College